GNOME Do (often referred to as Do) is a free and open-source application launcher for Linux originally created by David Siegel, and currently maintained by Alex Launi. Like other application launchers, it allows searching for applications and files, but it also allows specifying actions to perform on search results. GNOME Do allows for quick finding of miscellaneous artifacts of GNOME environment (applications, Evolution and Pidgin contacts, Firefox bookmarks, Rhythmbox artists and albums, and so on) and execute the basic actions on them (launch, open, email, chat, play, etc.).

While it is designed primarily for the GNOME desktop, it works in other desktop environments, such as KDE.

GNOME Do was inspired by Quicksilver for Mac OS X, and GNOME Launch Box.

Docky

Docky is a theme for GNOME Do that behaves much like the Mac OS X dock. Unlike GNOME Do's traditional interface, Docky can be set to one of three modes for hiding:
 None - Docky is always visible. 
 Autohide - Docky is normally hidden, and appears when the mouse pointer reaches Docky's (unseen) edge at the lower/upper edge of the screen.
 Intellihide - Docky hides if it overlaps any window in the active window group, but it can still be brought up with the mouse pointer as described above.

Standard Do functionality is still present within Docky, and the Do hot-key will still produce the expected behavior.

Docky 2 is a separate application from GNOME Do. Integration with GNOME Do is planned for Docky 2.

See also
 Comparison of applications launchers
 List of dock applications
 GNOME
 Mono

References

Further reading

 Nathan Willis (January 11, 2008) Find the items you want with GNOME Do, Linux.com
 Daniel Pop-Silaghi (28 February 2009) GNOME Do: The King of Launchers, Softpedia Application of the month
 Kevin Purdy (Feb 3, 2009) GNOME Do's Smart Dock Takes App Launching to Another Level, Lifehacker

External links

 
 
 GNOME Do: an Ontology-Informed, Search-DrivenCommand Interface for the GNU/Linux Desktop
 GNOME Do – Launcher tool to search and launch applications files and more, susegeek.com

Application launchers
Applications using D-Bus
Free software programmed in C Sharp
GNOME Applications
Graphical shells that use GTK
Software that uses Mono (software)